Matarbari Port is a deep sea port under-construction at Matarbari in Maheshkhali Upazila of Cox's Bazar District, Bangladesh.

History
Matarbari sea port was originally built for Matarbari coal-fired power plant then the government decided to turn it into a deep sea port.

On 29 December 2020, MV Venus Triumph, a 120 metres long general cargo ship, became the first foreign ship to dock at the port.

As per the original plan, the channel was supposed to be 3 km-long, 250 metres wide and 15 metres deep.

Development
Based on the Japanese ports of Kashima and Niigata, the port will be the first deep sea port and the fourth sea port in Bangladesh. The port is planned to reduce pressure on the Port of Chittagong. Ships with the capacity of 8,000 TEU containers will be able to dock. In September 2020, Japan International Cooperation Agency won the contract for the consultancy services of Matarbari Port development project. Two contracts were signed by Roads and Highways Department (RHD) with Oriental Consultants Global Company Ltd and by Chittagong Port Authority with Nippon Koei.

The container terminal will be built on 18 hectares, and have an annual capacity of 600,000 to 1.1 million TEU. Later, the container terminal will be expanded, up to 70 hectares, with a  berth, and have a 2.8 million TEU capacity.

JICA said the multi-purpose terminal will be built on 17 hectares, have a  berth, and be able to accommodate vessels with up to 70,000 dwt. Its annual capacity will be 2.25 million tonnes.

See also
 Ports in Bangladesh

References

Ports and harbours of Bangladesh